is a lighthouse on the island of Mutsurejima, which is administered by Shimonoseki, Yamaguchi, Japan.

History
The lighthouse was first lit in 1872, and was designed by Richard Henry Brunton, who was hired by the government of Japan at the beginning of the Meiji period to help construct lighthouses to make it safe for foreign ships.

See also

 List of lighthouses in Japan

References

Lighthouses completed in 1872
Lighthouses in Japan
Buildings and structures in Yamaguchi Prefecture